Hervé Ndonga Mianga (born 2 May 1992) is a Democratic Republic of the Congolese footballer, who currently plays for TP Mazembe as a midfielder.

Career
Mianga played for TP Mazembe in the 2010 FIFA Club World Cup, coming on as a substitute in the final where they lost 3–0 to Internazionale.

References

External links

1992 births
Living people
Democratic Republic of the Congo footballers
Progresso da Lunda Sul players
C.R.D. Libolo players
TP Mazembe players
Girabola players
Association football midfielders
21st-century Democratic Republic of the Congo people